Unión Deportiva Poblense is a Spanish football team based in Sa Pobla, Majorca, in the autonomous community of Balearic Islands. Founded in 1935, it plays in Tercera División - Group 11.

Team colours are shirt with blue and red vertical stripes, blue shorts and socks.

History
Poblense played from 1982 to 1989 in Segunda División B. Since their last relegation, the club continues playing in Tercera División.

Season to season

8 seasons in Segunda División B
55 seasons in Tercera División
21 seasons in Categorias Regionales

Honours

 Tercera División: 1980–81, 1981–82, 2019–20
 Categorías Regionales: 1941–42, 1947–48, 1949–50, 1950–51, 1953–54, 1958–59, 1969–70, 1973–74
 Baleares Championship: 1947–48, 1949–50, 1953–54

Current squad

Famous players

 Cundi
  Rubén Epitié
 Ivan Ramis
 Martí Crespí
 Miquel Buades
 Miquel Bennàssar "Molondro"
 Joan Jordan
 Joan Campins

Famous coaches

 Lorenzo Serra Ferrer

Stadium

The Nou Camp de Sa Pobla was inaugurated on January 17, 1977, although the first official match took place on the 29th, a 0–0 draw with Ontinyent CF. It was built by architect J. Jesús Pou Usallán with an 8,000-seat capacity. The surface of the playing field is natural grass and has a size of 105 x 74 m. The main tier of the stadium is covered, and its gallery is located in one room for the press.

References

External links

Official website 
FFIB team profile 
Futbolme team profile 
Sa Pobla Football Cup website 

Football clubs in the Balearic Islands
Sport in Mallorca
Association football clubs established in 1935
Sa Pobla
1935 establishments in Spain